Vladimir Aleksandrovich Kovin (born June 20, 1954 in Soviet Union), Владимир Александрович Ковин in Russian, is a retired ice hockey player who played in the Soviet Hockey League. He played for Torpedo (Gorky).

He competed for the Union of Soviet Socialist Republics in the 1984 Olympic Games where the Soviet team won the gold. He was inducted into the Russian and Soviet Hockey Hall of Fame in 1984.

Career statistics

Regular season and playoffs

International

External links
 Russian and Soviet Hockey Hall of Fame bio

1954 births
Living people
Sportspeople from Nizhny Novgorod
Ice hockey players at the 1984 Winter Olympics
Olympic gold medalists for the Soviet Union
Olympic ice hockey players of the Soviet Union
Expatriate ice hockey players in France
Soviet expatriate sportspeople in France
Soviet expatriate ice hockey players
Olympic medalists in ice hockey
Medalists at the 1984 Winter Olympics
Soviet ice hockey forwards
Honoured Masters of Sport of the USSR
Recipients of the Order of Friendship of Peoples
Hockey Club de Reims players
Diables Noirs de Tours players
Torpedo Nizhny Novgorod players
Russian ice hockey forwards